Heidenau is a town in the Sächsische Schweiz-Osterzgebirge district, in Saxony, Germany. The town is situated on the left bank of the Elbe, 13 km southeast of Dresden (centre).

In 2015, it became known for riots by local far-right forces against the arrival of refugees. In August 2015, authorities were forced to impose a temporary ban on assemblies in Heidenau due to continuous harassment of asylum-seekers.

References

External links
 

 
Populated riverside places in Germany
Populated places on the Elbe